Borrder is an Indian Tamil-language spy thriller film directed by Arivazhagan Venkatachalam and produced by Vijaya Raghavendra under the banner All in pictures. The film starring Arun Vijay, Regina Cassandra and Stefy Patel, revolves around patriotism. The film set in military backdrop is shot in Chennai, Delhi and Agra. The film is scheduled to be released theatrically on 24 February 2023.

Cast
 Arun Vijay as Aravind Chandrashekar, DIA agent 
 Regina Cassandra as Aparna
 Stefy Patel as Aravind's wife
 Bagavathi Perumal
 Shan as Yusuf Khan
 Chandrasekar Koneru as Commando Chief
 Sundeep Malani as Psychiatrist

Production
Arun Vijay and debutant Stefy Patel were cast to play the lead in the film. It was first titled as 'Zindabad' but later title was changed to Borrder. Actor Arun Vijay and director Arivazhagan Venkatachalam are working again after 2017 film Kuttram 23.  The final schedule began in December 2020.

Music
The music of the film is composed by Sam C. S. and lyrics are penned by Viveka. The soundtrack is released by Think Music.

Release
The film is scheduled to be released theatrically on 24 February 2023. Initially it was scheduled for release theatrically on 19 November 2021, but due to floods in Chennai the release was postponed indefinitely. It was later scheduled for 5 October 2022, but was again delayed.

References

External links
 

2023 films
Films about intelligence agencies
Films shot in Agra
Films shot in Chennai
Films shot in Delhi
Indian action thriller films
Indian spy thriller films
Films scored by Sam C. S.
Upcoming films
Upcoming Tamil-language films